"Thick as Thieves" is the lead single from Cavo's second studio album, Thick as Thieves.

Charts

References

2011 songs
Eleven: A Music Company singles
Cavo songs
Songs written by Ted Bruner